Gujjar railway station 
() is  located in  Pakistan.

See also
 List of railway stations in Pakistan
 Pakistan Railways

References

External links
 The Ministry of Railways (MoR)

Railway stations in Punjab, Pakistan